Peter Adams Garland (June 16, 1923 – January 26, 2005) was a one-term U.S. Representative from Maine, serving from 1961 to 1963.

Early life
Garland was born in Boston, Massachusetts. He attended Saco public schools and the Hotchkiss School in Lakeville, Connecticut.
He graduated from Bowdoin College, Brunswick, Maine, in 1945.

Career
Garland was an officer and director of Garland Manufacturing Co. in Saco, Maine, and Snocraft Co. in Norway, Maine. He served as an enlisted man in the United States Air Corps from 1943 to 1946, and director of the New England Council and Associated Industries of Maine from 1955 to 1957. Garland also served as a member of the Saco Superintending School Committee from 1952 to 1954. He served as mayor of Saco from 1956 to 1959, and was a New England field adviser for the Small Business Administration from 1958 to 1960.

Garland was elected as a Republican to the Eighty-seventh Congress (January 3, 1961 – January 3, 1963). He was an unsuccessful candidate for renomination to the Eighty-eighth Congress in 1962, and an unsuccessful candidate to the Ninetieth Congress in 1966.

Garland was a municipal town manager for Gorham, Maine from 1967 to 1969, a marketing director for an engineering firm from 1970 to 1972, and a city manager for Claremont, New Hampshire from 1972 to 1973. Additional public service included his being a community manager for Ocean Pines, Ocean City, Maryland from 1973 to 1974, a town manager for Searsport, Maine from 1974 to 1981, and a city manager for Bath, Maine from 1981 to 1989.

Death
Garland died on January 26, 2005, in Brunswick, Maine. He is interred at Oak Grove Cemetery in Bath, Maine.

References

External links
 

boston.com: Peter A. Garland, public servant was ex-congressman; 81

1923 births
2005 deaths
Bowdoin College alumni
Politicians from Boston
Politicians from Gorham, Maine
People from Searsport, Maine
People from Bath, Maine
United States Army soldiers
Republican Party members of the United States House of Representatives from Maine
American city managers
20th-century American politicians
People from Saco, Maine